Abron may refer to:

Abron (surname)
Abron tribe, West African ethnic group
Abron dialect, spoken by the Abron tribe
Abron (ancient Greece), numerous historical Greek people